Lombardy elected its first delegation to the Italian Senate on April 18, 1948. This election was a part of national Italian general election of 1948 even if, according to the newly established Italian Constitution, every senatorial challenge in each Region is a single and independent race.

The election was won by the centrist Christian Democracy, as it happened at national level. Pavia and Mantua were the sole provinces to oppose this result, giving a plurality to the Social-Communist alliance.

Background
Alcide De Gasperi's Christian Democracy had obtained very good results during quite all municipal elections in Lombardy in 1946. However, their Soviet-aligned opponents looked at this region as one of their possible zones of success, considering the local strength of the Socialist Party before the Fascist era.

Even if the Front obtained some seats in the agricultural south, De Gasperi obtained an absolute majority at regional level, with some exceptional peaks in the alpine north: Lombardy became the region with the highest number of constituencies where the landslide clausola was satisfied. The centre-left alliance between the Italian Democratic Socialist Party and the Italian Republican Party obtained some seats in Milan, a city led by Democratic Socialist mayor Antonio Greppi.

Electoral system
The electoral system introduced in 1948 for the newly elected Senate was a strange hybrid which established a form of proportional representation into FPTP-like constituencies. A candidate needed a landslide victory of more than 65% of votes to obtain a direct mandate. All constituencies where this result was not reached entered into an at-large calculation based upon the D'Hondt method to distribute the seats between the parties, and candidates with the best percentages of suffrages inside their party list were elected.

Results

|-
|- bgcolor="#E9E9E9"
!rowspan="1" align="left" valign="top"|Party
!rowspan="1" align="center" valign="top"|votes
!rowspan="1" align="center" valign="top"|votes (%)
!rowspan="1" align="center" valign="top"|seats
|-
!align="left" valign="top"|Christian Democracy
|valign="top"|1,854,032
|valign="top"|53.8
|valign="top"|18
|-
!align="left" valign="top"|Popular Democratic Front
|valign="top"|1,164,769
|valign="top"|33.8
|valign="top"|10
|-
!align="left" valign="top"|Socialist Unity+Italian Republican Party
|valign="top"|364,642
|valign="top"|10.8
|valign="top"|3
|-
!align="left" valign="top"|Others
|valign="top"|64,284
|valign="top"|1.9
|valign="top"|-
|- bgcolor="#E9E9E9"
!rowspan="1" align="left" valign="top"|Total parties
!rowspan="1" align="right" valign="top"|3,447,727
!rowspan="1" align="right" valign="top"|100.0
!rowspan="1" align="right" valign="top"|31
|}
Sources: Italian Ministry of the Interior

Constituencies

|-
|- bgcolor="#E9E9E9"
!align="left" valign="top"|N°
!align="center" valign="top"|Constituency
!align="center" valign="top"|Elected
!align="center" valign="top"|Party
!align="center" valign="top"|Votes %
!align="center" valign="top"|Others
|-
|align="left"|1
|align="left"|Bergamo
|align="left"|Cristoforo Pezzini
|align="left"|Christian Democracy
|align="left"|73.5%
|align="left"|
|-
|align="left"|2
|align="left"|Clusone
|align="left"|Pietro Bellora
|align="left"|Christian Democracy
|align="left"|81.0%
|align="left"|
|-
|align="left"|3
|align="left"|Treviglio
|align="left"|Piero Mentasti
|align="left"|Christian Democracy
|align="left"|72.7%
|align="left"|
|-
|align="left"|4
|align="left"|Brescia
|align="left"|Angelo Buizza
|align="left"|Christian Democracy
|align="left"|55.8%
|align="left"|
|-
|align="left"|5
|align="left"|Breno
|align="left"|Angelo Cemmi
|align="left"|Christian Democracy
|align="left"|68.6%
|align="left"|
|-
|align="left"|6
|align="left"|Chiari
|align="left"|Albino Donati
|align="left"|Christian Democracy
|align="left"|65.7%
|align="left"|
|-
|align="left"|7
|align="left"|Salò
|align="left"|Francesco Zane
|align="left"|Christian Democracy
|align="left"|64.2%
|align="left"|
|-
|align="left"|8
|align="left"|Como
|align="left"|Mariano Rosati
|align="left"|Christian Democracy
|align="left"|60.1%
|align="left"|
|-
|align="left"|9
|align="left"|Lecco
|align="left"|Enrico Falck
|align="left"|Christian Democracy
|align="left"|55.8%
|align="left"|
|-
|align="left"|10
|align="left"|Cantù
|align="left"|Lorenzo Spallino
|align="left"|Christian Democracy
|align="left"|60.3%
|align="left"|
|-
|align="left"|11
|align="left"|Cremona
|align="left"|Gaetano Ferragni
|align="left"|Popular Democratic Front (PSI)
|align="left"|48.3%
|align="left"|
|-
|align="left"|12
|align="left"|Crema
|align="left"|Ennio Zelioli
|align="left"|Christian Democracy
|align="left"|52.3%
|align="left"|
|-
|align="left"|13
|align="left"|Mantua
|align="left"|Pietro Torelli
|align="left"|Popular Democratic Front (PSI)
|align="left"|44.0%
|align="left"|
|-
|align="left"|14
|align="left"|Ostiglia
|align="left"|Clarenzo Menotti
|align="left"|Popular Democratic Front (PCI)
|align="left"|56.8%
|align="left"|
|-
|align="left"|15
|align="left"|Milan 1
|align="left"|<small>Merzagora's 2nd election
|align="left"|
|align="left"|57.9% 
|align="left"|''seat ceded to Samek Lodovici
|-
|align="left"|16
|align="left"|Milan 2
|align="left"|Gianbattista Boeri
|align="left"|Socialist Unity+Republican Party (PRI)
|align="left"|21.0%
|align="left"|Edoardo Origlia (DC) 54.5%
|-
|align="left"|17
|align="left"|Milan 3
|align="left"|Enrico Gonzales
|align="left"|Socialist Unity+Republican Party (PSDI)
|align="left"|19.5%
|align="left"|
|-
|align="left"|18
|align="left"|Milan 4
|align="left"|Giulio Bergmann
|align="left"|Socialist Unity+Republican Party (PRI)
|align="left"|20.0%
|align="left"|
|-
|align="left"|19
|align="left"|Milan 5
|align="left"|Piero Montagnani
|align="left"|Popular Democratic Front (PCI)
|align="left"|42.7%
|align="left"|
|-
|align="left"|20
|align="left"|Milan 6
|align="left"|Francesco Mariani
|align="left"|Popular Democratic Front (PSI)
|align="left"|51.8%
|align="left"|
|-
|align="left"|21
|align="left"|Abbiategrasso
|align="left"|E.Samek LodoviciAntonio Banfi
|align="left"|Christian DemocracyPopular Democratic Front (PCI)
|align="left"|51.4%40.6%
|align="left"|
|-
|align="left"|22
|align="left"|Rho
|align="left"|Carlo Perini
|align="left"|Christian Democracy
|align="left"|53.6%
|align="left"|Amilcare Locatelli (PSI) 36.2%
|-
|align="left"|23
|align="left"|Monza
|align="left"|Mario Longoni
|align="left"|Christian Democracy
|align="left"|54.0%
|align="left"|
|-
|align="left"|24
|align="left"|Vimercate
|align="left"|Cesare Merzagora
|align="left"|Christian Democracy (Indep.)
|align="left"|60.2%
|align="left"|
|-
|align="left"|25
|align="left"|Lodi
|align="left"|Giuseppe Alberganti
|align="left"|Popular Democratic Front (PCI)
|align="left"|43.6%
|align="left"|Gianmaria Cornaggia (DC) 47.7%
|-
|align="left"|26
|align="left"|Pavia
|align="left"|Italo Sinforiani
|align="left"|Popular Democratic Front (Gds)
|align="left"|43.0%
|align="left"|
|-
|align="left"|27
|align="left"|Voghera
|align="left"|Cesare Gavina
|align="left"|Popular Democratic Front (PCI)
|align="left"|38.7%
|align="left"|
|-
|align="left"|28
|align="left"|Vigevano
|align="left"|Giuseppe Cortese
|align="left"|Popular Democratic Front (PSI)
|align="left"|50.7%
|align="left"|
|-
|align="left"|29
|align="left"|Sondrio
|align="left"|Ezio Vanoni
|align="left"|Christian Democracy
|align="left"|67.1%
|align="left"|
|-
|align="left"|30
|align="left"|Varese
|align="left"|Antonio Bareggi
|align="left"|Christian Democracy
|align="left"|55.7%
|align="left"|
|-
|align="left"|31
|align="left"|Busto Arsizio 
|align="left"|Natale Santero
|align="left"|Christian Democracy
|align="left"|53.8%
|align="left"|
|}

Senators with a direct mandate have bold percentages. Please remember that the electoral system was, in the other cases, a form of proportional representation and not a FPTP race: so candidates winning with a simple plurality could have (and usually had) a candidate (always a Christian democrat) with more votes in their constituency.

Substitutions
Amilcare Locatelli for Rho (36.2%) replaced Pietro Torelli in 1948. Reason: death.
Edoardo Origlia for Milan 2 (54.5%) replaced Antonio Bareggi in 1950. Reason: death.
Gianmaria Cornaggia for Lodi (47.7%) replaced Carlo Perini in 1952. Reason: death.

Notes

Elections in Lombardy
1948 elections in Italy